Brendan Hines-Ike (born November 30, 1994) is an American professional soccer player who plays as a defender for Major League Soccer club D.C. United.

Youth and college
Hines-Ike started out playing as a forward when he was a kid. He played for his local club named Chivas Denver and credits many of his early successes to them. After playing for two more different clubs he was recruited to join his older brother in the youth ranks of Major League Soccer side Chivas USA. Hines-Ike played for the Chivas USA U-18 team from 2011–12, as team captain he led the team with 25 matches started, playing the most minutes on the squad. Hines-Ike signed a pro deal after playing for Chivas USA youth academy and college thereafter.

Hines-Ike then went on to play in college where he spent three years with Creighton Bluejays going to one College Cup and one Elite Eight. Hines-Ike trained with MLS Club Chivas USA Reserves and first team during summer offseason as well as captained Chivas USA U-23 PDL team. Selected as one of two team captains to start the season at USF, the 21-year-old started all 20 games in his first and only season as a Bull. He was named to the American Athletic Conference First Team, recording two goals on the season. In 2013, he was also named to the All-Big East Second Team while at Creighton. From there he went on to play one season with South Florida Bulls before signing with Swedish Allsvenskan club Örebro SK before the start of the 2016 Allsvenskan season.

Club career

Örebro SK
After signing a four-year contract with Örebro, Hines-Ike was drafted by the Montreal Impact in the third round of the 2016 MLS SuperDraft. Hines-Ike made his full professional debut in the Allsvenskan against Djurgården on April 3, 2016. Hines-Ike scored his first professional goal in the 69th minute in a 3:2 win against Hammarby IF. On October 2, 2016, Hines-Ike recorded his first professional assist in a loss against Djurgården.

K.V. Kortrijk
In July 2018, Hines-Ike was transferred to K.V. Kortrijk. The fee was reportedly set at $750K USD, making it the biggest sale in the history of Örebro SK and biggest purchase of KV Kortrijk's. On August 25, 2018, Hines-Ike recorded his first Jupiler Pro League assist for K.V. Kortrijk in the 9th minute against RSC Charleroi. On September 2, 2018, Hines-Ike recorded his first multi-assist game against KRC Genk tallying two assists. On April 2, 2019, Hines-Ike recorded his first career Jupiler Pro League playoff goal scoring in the 57th minute against Waasland-Beveren.

D.C. United
On March 8, 2021, Hines-Ike joined Major League Soccer club D.C. United on loan for the 2021 season. In his MLS debut, Hines-Ike scored in the 2–1 win over New York City FC.

On January 4, 2022, D.C. United made Hines-Ike's move to the club permanent for around $800k.

International career
Hines-Ike played in five United States men's national under-18 soccer team training camps throughout the 2011–12 season. Hines-Ike is in the process of obtaining an Irish passport as his grandparents were Irish. The Football Association of Ireland are interested in him.

References

External links

Creighton profile
South Florida profile

1994 births
Living people
Allsvenskan players
American soccer players
American expatriate soccer players
American expatriate sportspeople in Belgium
American expatriate sportspeople in Sweden
Association football defenders
Belgian Pro League players
Creighton Bluejays men's soccer players
Expatriate footballers in Belgium
Expatriate footballers in Sweden
K.V. Kortrijk players
D.C. United players
CF Montréal draft picks
Ocean City Nor'easters players
Örebro SK players
South Florida Bulls men's soccer players
USL League Two players
Soccer players from Denver
Major League Soccer players